Daniel Califano was an Argentine-American soccer defender who spent one season in the North American Soccer League.  He also earned one cap with the U.S. national team.

In Argentina, he played in 1966 three games for Club Ferro Carril Oeste in  First Division.

National team
Califano played his single game with the U.S. national team in a 1–0 win over Poland on August 3, 1973. He was replaced by Carmen Capurro in the 65th minute.

Professional
Califano, and most of his teammates, were from the second division American Soccer League after the first division North American Soccer League (NASL) refused to release players for the game.  In 1975, he signed with the San Antonio Thunder of the NASL.

References

American soccer players
Argentine emigrants to the United States
United States men's international soccer players
American Soccer League (1933–1983) players
North American Soccer League (1968–1984) players
San Antonio Thunder players
Living people
Association football defenders
Year of birth missing (living people)